Caledomicrus mimeticus is a species of beetle in the family Cerambycidae, and the only species in the genus Caledomicrus. It was described by Vives, Sudre, Mille and Cazères in 2011.

References

Parmenini
Beetles described in 2011